The 1927 County Championship was the 34th officially organised running of the County Championship. Lancashire County Cricket Club won the championship title for a second successive year. In May 1927, Warwickshire beat Yorkshire by eight wickets, which was Yorkshire's first loss in 71 consecutive matches in the County Championship.

Points Changes
Final placings were still decided by calculating the percentage of points gained against possible points available but in March 1927 the MCC revised the points scoring as follows:
 
Eight points were awarded for a win
Four points were awarded for a tie
Five points for the side leading after the first innings of a drawn match
Three points for the side losing after the first innings of a drawn match
Four points for the sides if tied after the first innings of a drawn match
Four points for a no result on first innings (after more than six hours playing time)
If the weather reduces a match to less than six hours and there has not been a result on first innings then the match shall be void.

Table

 *includes a tie on first innings

References

1927 in English cricket
County Championship seasons